Oleh Mayik (born 23 October 1994) is a Ukrainian professional football striker.

Career
Mayik is the product of the FC Lviv Sportive School. His first coach was Mykola Dudarenko.

He made his debut for the first team in a match against FC Krymteplytsia Molodizhne in the Ukrainian First League on 20 March 2011.

References

External links
 
 

1994 births
Living people
Ukrainian footballers
FC Lviv players
Association football forwards
FC Dynamo Kyiv players
FC Dynamo-2 Kyiv players
FC Cherkashchyna players
Kotwica Kołobrzeg footballers
NK Veres Rivne players
FC Mynai players
Ukrainian First League players
Ukrainian Second League players
Ukrainian expatriate footballers
Expatriate footballers in Poland
Ukrainian expatriate sportspeople in Poland
Sportspeople from Lviv Oblast